Into Thin Air: Death on Everest is a 1997 disaster television film based on Jon Krakauer's memoir Into Thin Air (1997). The film, directed by Robert Markowitz and written by Robert J. Avrech, tells the story of the 1996 Mount Everest disaster. It was broadcast on ABC on November 9, 1997.

Plot
Summit guides Rob Hall (Nat Parker) and Scott Fischer (Peter Horton) discuss with their clients their plans to reach the summit. Hall's group comprises Doug Hansen, a mailman from Seattle, Jon Krakauer, Yasuko Namba, and several others. Fischer's group includes New York socialite and experienced climber Sandy Pittman. At base camp, Hall talks about baby names with his wife, Jan, who is pregnant in New Zealand. The groups slowly make their way through Camps 2, 3, and 4, and begin their ascent to the summit. In Camp 2, Fischer is forced to climb the entire way back down with a sick client, Dale Cruz, for help. Fischer refuses help and returns tired and out of breath.

Both groups make steady pace to the bottom of the Hillary step, where they discover there are no fixed ropes. The Sherpa there states it's a two-person job and the other Sherpa never arrived, due to being tired and ill from dragging Pittman and all her heavy equipment up. Mountain Madness guides Anatoli Boukreev and Neil Beidelman set the fixed ropes. By then dozens of climbers have reached the step, and congestion has formed at the bottom. Krakauer continues to the summit with Boukreev. They are joined shortly afterward by Adventure Consultants guide Andy Harris. Krakauer begins his descent and finds the jam at the step has worsened. He is forced to wait.

Meanwhile, Hall tells Hansen they have to turn back. Hansen refuses, as he failed to reach the summit the previous year and won't be able to afford a third attempt. Hall and Hansen argue until Hall caves in. They continue, missing Hall's 2 p.m. turnaround time. When the step clears, Harris begins to descend. Krakauer begins to hallucinate from lack of oxygen, as Harris had increased his oxygen flow when Krakauer asked for it to be decreased earlier during the climb. Krakauer nearly falls over a precipice but manages to catch himself. He makes his way down to Harris and realizes something is wrong with Harris, as the latter thinks the full bottles at the oxygen drop are empty. Krakauer runs into Hansen and Hall and notes to Hansen that storm clouds are coming up through the valley and up the mountain. Shortly after 3 p.m., most of the members of Hall's and Fischer's groups reach the summit.

Krakauer continues his descent and runs into Fischer, who is completely exhausted and refuses to turn around. Shortly after 4, Hall and Hansen reach the summit. Hall remarks that a storm is coming. As the weather worsens, Krakauer finds Beck Weathers sitting alone in the snow. Weathers had eye surgery prior to the trip and lost his vision during the ascent. He declines leaving with Krakauer, having promised Hall he would wait for the latter. At 4:30, Fischer and Sherpa Lopsang reach the summit, and Fischer collapses. Krakauer reaches Camp 4 and goes to sleep. Beidelman, Mike Groom, and most of the clients stop to rest. They encounter Weathers, who agrees to descend with them. Storm clouds and heavy snowfall cause the guides to become lost. Higher on the mountain, Hall and Hansen drag Fischer, who is too weak to stand.

Night falls, and Krakauer is awoken in his tent by Hall's Sherpa, Angdorjee, who says Hall and most of the clients have not returned. The pair searches for them, but quickly finds conditions too treacherous. Hall tries to convince Hansen to stand and continue descending, but Hansen begs Hall to leave him. Hall refuses to leave Hansen behind, and they continue. Fischer, suffering from edema, walks off the side of the mountain. Lopsang saves him by pulling him back up with the short rope connecting them. Fischer begins to fall unconscious, and Lopsang radios for help.

Hall, struggling with the hallucinating Hansen, slips and falls. The two are separated, and Hall watches Hansen fall to his death. Harris finds Hall and tries to help him up before leaving to get help, despite Hall's pleas. Harris disappears from Hall's sight but cries out. Hall crawls over to find Harris's hat lying next to a large drop and assumes the latter has fallen to his death. Buried under snow, Hall gets directions from Krakauer to an oxygen supply, but falls down. He does not see the oxygen bottles nearby.

Beidelman and Groom's group becomes hopelessly lost. The guides take only the clients who can keep up with them, leaving behind Namba, Weathers, Pittman, and Charlotte Fox. Fischer drifts in and out of consciousness, during which time he mutters the words "I am invincible" to Lopsang. Boukreev helps Fox and Pittman descend but is unable to get a third client. Hall hallucinates about seeing Jan, then snaps outs of it. His hands and legs are frostbitten and he has trouble moving. He blacks out again.

Hall awakens the next morning, barely alive. He radios the camp and is able to speak with Jan. The couple decides to name their daughter Sarah. Hall says goodbye to his wife and dies from hypothermia. Weathers awakes, having survived being buried under snow without oxygen. Still blinded, he stumbles back to camp and receives help. Boukreev climbs up and finds Fischer's frozen body. He says goodbye, covers Fischer's face, and leaves. Back at base camp, the survivors reminisce about the friends they have lost.

Cast
 Christopher McDonald as Jon Krakauer
 Peter Horton as Scott Fischer
 Nathaniel Parker as Rob Hall
 Richard Jenkins as Beck Weathers
 Tim Dutton as Andy Harris
 Jeff Perry as Doug Hansen
 Akemi Otani as Yasuko Namba
 Peter J. Lucas as Anatoli Boukreev

See also
Everest, a 2015 film about the disaster
List of media related to Mount Everest

References

External links

1997 films
1997 television films
1990s disaster films
1997 drama films
American disaster films
Czech disaster films
Czech drama films
Czech television films
Disaster films based on actual events
Disaster television films
Drama films based on actual events
American drama television films
Films scored by Lee Holdridge
Films about death
Films about Mount Everest
Films directed by Robert Markowitz
American survival films
Films based on non-fiction books
1990s American films